Gastón Guruceaga Fernández (born 15 March 1995) is a Uruguayan professional footballer who plays as a goalkeeper for Montevideo City Torque.

Club career

Peñarol
Guruceaga played all his career for Peñarol. He made his professional debut in club football in the first game of the 2015–16 Uruguayan Primera División season against Cerro at Estadio Centenario in a 3-0 win for his team. Peñarol won the Uruguayan Primera División that year.

In the following season and due to the last minute departure to italian side Fiorentina of planned to be captain of the team Maximiliano Olivera, Guruceaga was chosen to be the captain of Peñarol by the manager Jorge da Silva with only 21 years.

On 24 January 2018, Guruceaga was loaned to Paraguayan club Guaraní for one year.

International career
He represented Uruguay on the 2015 South American Youth Football Championship held in Uruguay between 14 January and 7 February and where the local team with Guruceaga starting every game of the tournament, finished third qualifying for the 2015 FIFA U-20 World Cup. Guruceaga was named best goalkeeper of the tournament.

He was selected to represent the national team in the 2015 FIFA U-20 World Cup later that year where he also was the starting goalkeeper on all the four games Uruguay played on the tournament.

Guruceaga was named in Uruguay's provisional squad for Copa América Centenario but was cut from the final squad.

Honours
Peñarol
Uruguayan Primera División: 2015–16, 2017

Tigre
Copa de la Superliga: 2019

References

External links
 
 

1995 births
Living people
People from Artigas Department
Uruguayan footballers
Uruguayan expatriate footballers
Uruguay under-20 international footballers
Uruguayan Primera División players
Paraguayan Primera División players
Argentine Primera División players
Chilean Primera División players
Peñarol players
Club Guaraní players
Club Atlético Tigre footballers
Club Deportivo Palestino footballers
Montevideo City Torque players
Association football goalkeepers
Uruguayan people of Basque descent
Expatriate footballers in Argentina
Expatriate footballers in Chile
Expatriate footballers in Paraguay
Uruguayan expatriate sportspeople in Argentina
Uruguayan expatriate sportspeople in Chile
Uruguayan expatriate sportspeople in Paraguay